Pizer is a surname. Notable people with the surname include:

Donald Pizer, American academic and literary critic
Dorothy Pizer (c. 1906–1964), British activist
Elizabeth Hayden Pizer (born 1954), American composer, music journalist, archivist and broadcast producer
Marjorie Pizer (1920–2016), Australian poet

See also
Pfizer